Premer Phande; was a popular romantic comedy Bengali television Soap Opera that premiered on April 18, 2016, and airs on Zee Bangla, produced by Ravi Ojha Productions and starred Mishmee Das as main female protagonist and Rajib Basu as main male protagonist.

Plot summary 
The story revolves around the lives of Mohor and Rishi. Rishi belongs to a joint family and works for a matrimonial company. Rishi's family is very supportive. He is a young lad and being the elder among two brothers, he is loved and pampered by everyone in the family. On the other hand, Mohor is a mature orphan girl. Mohor comes to Kolkata for her job. One fine day, much to his disgust, Mohor joins the matrimonial company as Rishi's boss. Mohor, who is new in the city, ends up becoming a tenant at Rishi's house. Rishi's family likes Mohor very much and his grandmother wants that Rishi should fall in love with Mohor. From here, starts the sweet fun chemistry of Rishi and Mohor, who being the boss troubles Rishi at work and Rishi, being the landlord irritates Mohor at home. This creates a hilarious ruckus due to the unconventional role reversal of Mohor and Rishi. Will this unique chemistry give rise to a sweet love story?

Casts
 Mishmee Das as Mohor Roy / Priyanka Majumdar 
 Rajib Basu as Rishi Ganguly
 Tanima Sen as Rishi's Grandmother 
 Anirban Guha as Rishi's Father 
 Chaitali Dutta Burman as Srimoyee Ganguly
 Kanchana Moitra as Shiuli Ganguly 
 Abhijit Deb Roy as Rishi's Uncle
 Aniket Chakraborty as Jeet Ganguly
 Partha Sarathi Deb as Mishra Ji 
 Sujoy Saha as Bijit 
 Misty Das as Mili Ganguly 
 Piyali Mukherjee as Tithi Ganguly 
 Arnab Banerjee as Jayanta Ganguly
 Koushik Chakraborty as Barin Majumdar

References

External links

2016 Indian television series debuts
Bengali-language television programming in India
Zee Bangla original programming